Masonic College was a higher education institution in Missouri that was established by Freemasons in 1844 and operated until 1857.

History
The Grand Lodge of Missouri opened the first Masonic College in Philadelphia, Missouri, beginning in spring of 1844.  The institution was initially operated using property and facilities previously used by Marion College.  However, the facilities in Philadelphia were insufficient, so the school administration soon sought a new location.

In 1847, the citizens of Lexington, Missouri subscribed $30,000 to relocate the college. On May 18, 1847, the Grand Lodge of Masons in Missouri laid the cornerstone of the Masonic College in Lexington. The solemn ceremony was conducted by Grand Master Joseph Foster. The building was erected and dedicated on July 11, 1848. It was built in the Greek Revival style with four fluted Ionic columns. A 28 x  chapel was in the basement.

The college was primarily for the benefit of the orphan children of deceased Masons, any children named Mason, and each member in the state was to pay a small per capita tax to support it.  Facing severe financial shortfalls, the college closed in 1857.

During the American Civil War Battle of Lexington I, the building and grounds served as Federal headquarters for the forces under Colonel James A. Mulligan, who surrendered after a three-day siege, September 18–20, 1861.  It was later abandoned by the Missouri State Guard, and the college was used by Federal troops for the remainder of the war.  Soon after the conclusion of the war, the building and grounds were transferred to the state, and a military institute was opened, but that school failed as well.  In 1871, the Masons transferred ownership to Central Female College, which later changed its name to Central College for Women.  It operated from 1871 until 1925.  The building burned in a fire on August 20, 1932.  It is now the site of College Park in Lexington where, in 1934, the Grand Lodge of Missouri, Freemasons, erected a one-quarter scale replica of the original Masonic College building.  The replica is surrounded by four columns, which stand at the four corners of the original structure. The columns individually commemorate the Battle of Lexington, the Central College for Women, the presidents of the college, and the students who attended the institution.  The replica building, which still stands, was dedicated May 18, 1934, in a ceremony led by Grand Master Frank Clinton Barnhill.

Notable alumni

 Senator Thomas Benton Catron
 Congressman  Stephen Benton Elkins
 Kansas City businessman Richard H. Keith
 Missouri Governor  John S. Marmaduke
 St. Louis lawyer Alonzo W. Slayback
 Montana Chief Justice William Y. Pemberton

Presidents
J. Worthington Smith, 1844–1847
Adiel Sherwood, 1848–1849
C.G. MacPherson, 1849–1850
Ferdinand LaBoma Shaver, 1850–1853
Archibald Patterson, 1853–1855
William T. Davis, 1855–1859

References

Chiles, Henry C. The Masonic College of Missouri.  The Grand Lodge A.F. & A.M. of Missouri, 1935.
Brown, Ray C.List of Missouri Colleges that Closed, Merged, or Changed Names

Buildings and structures in Marion County, Missouri
Masonic buildings in Missouri
Masonic educational institutions in the United States
Defunct private universities and colleges in Missouri
Educational institutions established in 1844
1844 establishments in Missouri
1857 disestablishments in Missouri
Educational institutions disestablished in 1857